Mehdi Shiri (born January 31, 1991, in Iran) is an Iranian professional football player who plays for Foolad in the Persian Gulf Pro League. After playing for Peykan in first half of 2018–19, he joined Persepolis as a right back.

Club Career Statistics

Honours

Club
 Persepolis
 Persian Gulf Pro League (3): 2018–19, 2019–20, 2020–21
 Hazfi Cup (1): 2018–19
 Iranian Super Cup (2): 2019, 2020

References

External links
 Mehdi Shiri at *** Persian League

Iranian footballers
Living people
Persian Gulf Pro League players
Persepolis F.C. players
Malavan players
1991 births
Association football fullbacks
Paykan F.C. players
Naft Tehran F.C. players
Niroye Zamini players
Foolad FC players